Isoplexis is a section of four species of flowering plants  within the genus Digitalis in the plantain family Plantaginaceae. The species of section Isoplexis differ from other plants in the genus Digitalis in that their monosymmetric (sometimes called zygomorphic)  flowers have a distinctive large upper lip rather than large lower lip and the species are endemic to the Canary Islands (the species D. canariensis, D. chalcantha, and D. isabelliana) and Madeira (D. sceptrum).

Two Isoplexis species, D. canariensis and D. sceptrum, were first described by Carl Linnaeus in 1753 as part of the genus Digitalis. Since then the section has undergone several changes, the addition of two more species and more importantly being moved to a separate genus, under the genus name of Isoplexis or sometimes Callianassa, back and forth many times (Lindley 1821, Loudon 1829, Bentham 1835, Webb 1845, Wetstein 1891, Himmelbaeur and Zwillinger 1927, Werner 1960–1966, Heywood 1972). The position of Isoplexis as a section within Digitalis was finally proven by Carvalho in 1999 using molecular data and published by Brauchler et al. in 2004.
Isoplexis species grow in woody habitats: D. canariensis in humid woodland areas and rarely in dry woodland areas, D. isabelliana in Pinus canariensis woodland and open disturbed areas,D. sceptrum in the cloud zone community Clethro-Laurion (Sjogren 1972) near streams on steep slopes, and D. chalcantha in Canary Island laurel forest.

The flowers of Isoplexis species appear to be adapted for bird pollination. It was once thought that the original pollinators of Isoplexis and the other Canarian bird pollinated plants (such as members of the genera Canarina and Lotus) were sunbirds which had become extinct on the Canary Islands; this might explain why Isoplexis species are rare and considered endangered species (Vogel 1954; Vogel et al. 1984; Valido et al. 2004).  However more recent work has shown that these plants are adequately pollinated by non-specialist flower visiting birds, particularly the Canary Islands chiffchaff (Phylloscopus canariensis), and the Canary Sardinian warbler (Sylvia melanocephala leucogastre) (Olesen 1985, Ollerton et al. 2008), and in fact show some specific adaptations to infrequent pollination by these birds, such as extended flower lifespans (Ollerton et al. 2008), and a hexose-dominated sugar ratio in the composition of the nectar (Dupont et al. 2004).

References 
Some of this text has been modified from Toomey, N. (2004). "Investigation of the phylogenetic utility of Cycloidea-like genes in various angiosperm lineages". PhD thesis. University of Reading, England.
Brauchler, C.; Meimberg, H. & Heubl, G. (2004). "Molecular Phylogeny of the genera Digitalis. L and Isoplexis (Lindley) Loudon (Veronicaceae) based on ITS- and trnL-F sequences". Plant Systematics and Evolution. 248 (1-4) 111-128.
Bentham, G. (1835). In: Edwards's Botanical Register. (Lindley, J.). Vol. 21 pp. [I], [9, ind.] ad 1770 [3]. 1 June 1835, London
Carvalho, J. A. S. S. (1999). "Systematic studies of the genera Digitalis L. and Isoplexis (Lindl.) Loud. (Scrophulariaceae: Digitaleae) and conservation of Isoplexis species". PhD thesis, University of Reading, England
Dupont, Y. L.; Hansen, D. M.; Rasmussen, J. T. & Olesen, J. M. (2004). "Evolutionary changes in nectar sugar composition associated with switches between bird and insect pollination: the Canarian bird-flower element revisited". Functional Ecology. 18 670-676.
Heywood, V. H. (1972). "Flora Europaea: notulae systematicae ad floram Europaeam spectantes no. 13. Scrophulariaceae: Digitalis L. Sect. Macranthae Heywood, sect nov." Botanical Journal of the Linnean Society. 65 (4): 357.
Himmelbaeur, W. & Zwillinger, E. (1927). "Biologische-chemische Formenkreise in der Gattung Digitalis L." Biologia Generalis. 3 595-684.
Lindley, J. (1821). Digitalium Monographia. H. H. Bohte, Londini, pg 27.
Linnaeus, C. (1753). Species Plantarum. Vol II 561–1200. Impensis Laurentii Salvii, Holmaniae.
Loudon, J. C. (1829). Encyclopaedia of Plants. 528 528-529.
Olesen, J. M. (1985). "The Macaronesian bird-flower element and its relation to bird and bee opportunists". The Botanical Journal of the Linnean Society. 91: 395-414.
Ollerton, J.; Cranmer, L.; Stelzer, R.; Sullivan, S. & Chittka, L. (2008). "Bird pollination of Canary Island endemic plants". Nature Precedings.
Sjögren, E. (1972). "Local climatic conditions and zonation of vegetation on Madeira". Agrronomia Lusitana. 36 (2) 95-139.
Valido, A.; Dupont, Y. L. & Olesen, J. M. (2004). "Bird-flower interactions in the Macaronesian islands". Journal of Biogeography 31: 1945-1953.
Vogel, S. (1954). "Blütenbiologische Typen als Elemente der Sippengliederung". Botanische Studien (Jena). 1: 1-338.
Vogel, S.; Westerkamp, C.; Thiel, B. & Gessner, K. (1984). "Ornithophilie auf den Canarischen Inseln". Plant Systematics and Evolution 146: 225-248.
Webb, P. B. (1845). Histoire Naturelle des Isles Canaries 3 (2-3): 144.
Werner, K. (1960). "Zur nomenklatur und taxonomie von Digitalis L." Botanische Jahrbucher fur Systematic, Pflanzengeschichte und Pflanzengeographie. 79 (2): 218-254.
Werner, K. (1962). "Die kultivieten Digitalis" Arten. Feddes Repertorium. 70: 167-182.
Werner, K. (1964). "Die verbreitung der Digitalis. Arten. Wiss. Z. Marin-Luther Univ. Halle-Wittenberg, Math. Naturwiss. Reihe 13: 453-486.
Werner, K. (1965). "Taxonomie und phylogenie der gattungen Isoplexis (Lindl.) Benth und Digitalis L. Feddes Repertorium 70: 109-135.
Werner, K. (1966). "Die wuschformen der gattungen Isoplexis (Lindl.) Benth. und Digitalis L." Botanische Jahrbucher fur Systematic, Pflanzengeschichte und Pflanzengeographie. 85 (1): 88-149.
Wettstein, V. (1891). "Scrophulariaceae. Rhinantoideae-Digitaleae". In: Die Naturlichen Pflanzenfamilien IV 3b (Engler, A. & Prantl, K. Eds.) pp. 83–90. Wilhelm Engelmann, Leipzig.

Plantaginaceae
Endemic flora of Macaronesia